Fiona A. White is a professor of social psychology at the University of Sydney, Australia, and director of the Sydney University Psychology of Intergroup Relations (SUPIR) Lab., and degree coordinator of the Bachelor of Liberal Arts and Science (BLAS). She has been a lead author on four editions of Developmental Psychology: From Infancy to Adulthood. White is known as the developer of the E-contact intervention, a synchronous online tool that has been found to reduce anxiety, prejudice, and stigma.

Research 
White's research is noted for advancing new and effective strategies (i.e., cooperative Electronic- or E-contact; dual identity recategorization; perspective taking etc) to promote positive intergroup relations in the short- and long-term.

Her most significant contribution to the intergroup relations literature is the development and validation of the E-contact tool, a computer mediated text-based contact that involves a synchronous conversation between members from non-stigmatised and stigmatised groups. Fiona has led a number of prejudice and stigma reduction research projects, and has received competitive funding from the Australian Research Council, and ViCHealth.

Research area and topics of interest

E-contact and long-term bias reduction 

White's Dual Identity Electronic Contact (DIEC) program was funded by an Australian Research Council Discovery Grant (2009–11). The DIEC program advanced a new conceptual framework proposing that cognitive strategies such as dual identity recategorization provides the necessary mechanism to enhance the benefits of social (i.e., contact) strategies such as E-contact. Here, achieving a common goal via contact is facilitated by the formation of a common identity between minority and majority members over a 9-week classroom program. This conceptual integration was found to successfully promote and sustain (at a 1-year follow-up) bias reduction for both Muslim and Catholic high-school students who were religiously segregated. Previous contact research had been limited in it theoretical focus, had not experimentally manipulated contact and examined only short-term outcomes.

E-contact and short-term bias reduction 

White has also developed and evaluated a new lab-based version of E-contact which involves participants text chatting in a synchronous 15-minute online interaction with an outgroup member. This new short-form version of E-contact is also theoretically-framed by integrating Allport's facilitating conditions of contact and dual identity recategorization, and has received significant empirical support across multiple social and cultural contexts: amongst sexual minorities; Protestants and Catholics in Northern Ireland; mentally healthy people and people with schizophrenia; and Turkish and Kurdish peoples.

A refocusing on the 'intergroup' nature of prejudice 

White's research adopts an intergroup perspective to prejudice, where both ingroup and outgroup voices need be included in interventions in order to successfully reduce intergroup tensions and conflicts.

References

External links 
 Sydney University Psychology of Intergroup Relations (SUPIR) Lab 
Bachelor of Liberal Arts and Science

Year of birth missing (living people)
Living people
Australian women psychologists
University of Sydney alumni
Academic staff of the University of Sydney
Social psychologists
Australian psychologists